Midwest Engineering & Design (also called just Midwest Engineering) is an American aircraft, boat and submarine manufacturer based in Overland Park, Kansas. The company specializes in the design and manufacture of a wide variety of vehicles and other products under the motto "Exploring our world by land, sea and air".

The company is a division of Digital Marketing USA.

The company's products include autogyros, sailboats, submarines, Scuba diver propulsion vehicle, hydrofoils, off-road motorcycles, amphibious gliders, underwater camera housings, hydrophones, powered paragliders, a line of outdoor cookbooks and a discontinued line of ultralight aircraft and helicopters. Some products are available as plans, kits, parts or complete units.

Aircraft

References

External links

Aircraft manufacturers of the United States
Homebuilt aircraft
Ultralight aircraft